The Panachikkadu Temple, also known as the Dakshina Mookambika (Mookambika of the South) Temple, is a Hindu temple dedicated to the goddess Saraswati. The temple is located in the southern region of the Indian Peninsula, in Panachikkad in Kottayam District, Kerala, India. It is one of the most prominent Saraswati temples for devotees in Kerala. But, the main deity of the temple is Lord Vishnu, who was installed long before Goddess Saraswati. Still the temple is known as Saraswati temple, due to the popularity of the Goddess. There are sub-shrines for Lord Shiva, Lord Ganapathi, Lord Ayyappan, Snake deities and Panachikkattu Yakshi inside the temple.

Legend

Kottarathil Sankunni's Aithihyamala has a detailed description of the temple, which has more than a thousand years of history. Nambudiri of Kizhapuram Illam had no male heirs to carry out the rites. He was about 60 years of age and had lost all hope of having a son. He set off to Varanasi to take a bath in the holy river Ganges. On the way, he stopped at Mookambika and stayed there for a few days and prayed to his deity. The serenity of the place enamored him and he decided to chant bhajans there for a year. After spending a year in the temple, the old man dreamed of a beautiful woman who appeared and told him that it was impossible for him to have a child in this life, and told him that it would be better for him to go back to his home and adopt a child from a family Karunattu nearby. The woman of that family would be destined to have two children in the near future. The old man accepted his fate and returned to his homeland.

Upon reaching Panachikkadu, he decided to take a bath in the temple pond. He put his Olakuda (umbrella made of palm leaves), on the southern side of the temple and went to bathe. After the bath, he tried to pick up his umbrella, but he couldn't. The Nambudiri stood puzzled. Then a man magically materialized and explained to the Nambudiri that the Goddess Mookambika Devi was staying in the umbrella and that the Nambudiri would have to transfer the divinity to an idol before he could retrieve the umbrella. He also told the Nambudiri that an idol suitable for transfer was lying hidden in the nearby forest. He warned him that he would have to appease its protector, a Yakshi, before taking the idol. The Nambudiri did as he was told and the Goddess Panachikkadu Devi was established as the deity of the place. Another smaller idol was placed facing west as Archana Bimbam. The idol was erected in a low terrain filled with water without a roof, making it seem as if the Devi was seated in the middle of a pond.

The main deity is now covered with creepers and shrubs and is not clearly visible. The leaves of the creepers are considered Saraswati leaves. The spring water flows continuously until it touches the feet of the Devi. This water never dries, not even in the peak time of summer. Since the Devi remains on such a saras (small rivulet), the Goddess is called Saraswati. The water required for pooja and other needs is drawn from the spring. No other water sources seem to exist.

Surroundings
Above the Saraswati temple on the western side, there is a natural habitat made of exotic plants and their fragrant flowers. There lives the Yakshi, who is at once fastidious and easily made happy. The idol of a Brahmarakshas is also installed there. Even though there are Yakshi shrines in other temples, the power of the Yakshi at Panachikkadu is supposed to be more manifested. The idol of Yakshi has no structure to cover it. It is installed under the trees like Elanji and Ezhilam Pala. The trusteeship of the shrine is vested with Kizhapuram, Karunattu and Kaimukku Nambudiri Illams. They are the residents of Panachikkadu. The boys of the Illams carry out the rites there.

Stone carvings on the walls illustrate Lord Vishnu and his servants playing a game similar to modern day Volleyball. This is supposed to be a representation of Vishnu's Preservation of the Universe, as he is seen dominating the opposition. These inscriptions also seem to suggest that India, and not USA, might have been the birthplace of the game.

The major festival this temple hosts is the Saraswati Pooja in the month of Thulam [A month in the Malayalam calendar known as Kollavarsham (Kolla era)] which falls approximately in September–October)]. During this festival, also known as Navaratri (Nine Nights), a large number of pilgrims congregate here to pay homage to the deity.

From various parts of India, devotees come here for Darshan, and religious people come here for Vidyarambham (the formal initiation of education with the introduction of alphabets). The ceremony of Vidyarambham(ritual start of education and art) is held on Vijayadashami (last day of Navarathri). On the day of ceremony, quite a number of people arrive at this temple to initiate the education of their children.

A major international cultural festival of all sort of arts including classical dance and music is also held in the temple for the duration of the nine nights of the Navarathri festival. Very famous performing artists/poets/writers like Karthika Thirunal RamaVarma Maharaja (Dharma Raja), Kerala Varma Valiakoyi Thampuran, A.R. Raja Raja Varma, Ulloor S. Parameswara Iyer, K J Yesudas, Kaithapram Damodaran Namboothiri etc have visited the temple art performing and bhajanam(meditation).

The temple is well connected through roads and there are many routes lead to this divine Temple:
(1) 4.1KM from Chingavanam Junction(MC Road) via Paruthumpara Junction (2) 4KM from Puthuppally Junction. 
(3) 6KM from Vakathanam via Paruthumpara Junction. 
(4) 4.8KM from Pannimattom Junction via Paruthumpara Junction.
(5) 16 KM from Pambadi from KK Road
Nearest Bus stands and Railway Stations are Kottayam (11 KMs) and Changanacherry (13 KMs).  Nearest airport is Kochi (100 KMs).

See also
 Temples of Kerala
 Saraswathi Temple

References

External links

 The official website of Dakshina Mookambika Temple

Hindu temples in Kottayam district
Saraswati temples